Wisdoms Store is an extinct town in Harris County, in the U.S. state of Georgia.

History
A post office called Wisdom's Store was established in 1856, and remained in operation until 1903. The community was named after William C. Wisdom (1833-1898), a local resident, county judge and state legislator.

References

Geography of Harris County, Georgia
Ghost towns in Georgia (U.S. state)